A1: Accused No. 1 is a 2019 Indian Tamil-language romantic comedy film written and directed by Johnson K in his directorial debut. The film stars Santhanam and Tara Alisha Berry. Producer S. Raj Narayanan of CircleBox Entertainment has produced this movie. The music for the film is composed by Santhosh Narayanan and cinematography is handled by Gopi Jagadeeswaran. The movie was edited by Leo John Paul, song lyrics were penned by Rokesh, art direction was executed by A. Raja, dance choreography by Kalyan and Sandy, and stunts by Hari Dinesh. Principal photography commenced around October 2018. The film was released on 26 July 2019. A1 received positive reviews from critics and became a box-office success.

Plot
Saravanan a.k.a. Saro is a happy-go-lucky guy and retail cloth store owner, from North Chennai. Divya is the only daughter of an honest and most respected IAS officer, Anantharaman. Divya wishes to marry a rogue but has a condition that he should be from her same Brahmin community. Divya spots Saro fighting with a few goons and immediately develops a liking towards him as she mistakes him to be a Brahmin. Divya proposes to Saro, and they both start dating.

Now, Divya finds out that Saro is not a Brahmin and decides to break up. Saro gets angry but decides to break up as Divya is strong in her decision of marrying only a Brahmin. One day, Anantharaman gets a heart attack while walking on the road. Saro spots Anantharaman struggling and saves him by admitting in the hospital at the right time. Divya gets to know that it was Saro who saved her father in a timely manner, which makes her patch up with Saro again.

Saro meets Anantharaman with a marriage proposal, but Anantharaman turns it down, citing caste differences. Divya does not want to go against her father's wishes as she respects her father a lot. Saro challenges Divya that every human has an evil side and her father is not an exception, to which Divya does not agree. Saro gets frustrated because of the breakup and is drunk. He discusses with his friends that he wants to kill Anantharaman as he is the main villain for his love.

The next day, Saro's drunk friends decide to kidnap and kill Anantharaman as they are thinking of helping Saro. They kidnap Anantharaman while he is out for jogging but forcefully feed him poison, following which he faints. Saro gets angered upon knowing his friends’ foolish plan and scolds them for their actions. However, to safeguard him and his friends, Saro takes Anantharaman's body to Divya's house and lies that her father passed away due to a heart attack while jogging.

Everyone gathers for the cremation ceremony of Anantharaman. Saro tries hard to pretend that no one finds out the truth about his friends’ involvement in the murder. Finally, Saro's friend discloses that they have mistakenly fed him anesthesia instead of poison, and so Anantharaman should only be in an unconscious state and is not dead yet. Saro gets even more angry as his friends have put him in bigger trouble.

Suddenly, there comes a couple of two women claiming them to be Anantharaman's wives. Divya gets shocked upon knowing that her father had extramarital affairs with a few more women. Now slowly, Anantharaman wakes up as the anesthesia's effect is recovered and is shocked to see all of his women together. Saro uses this situation to his advantage and informs Divya that this drama was set by him to prove that every human has an evil side. Finally, Saro joins with Divya.

Cast

Production 
The film was announced by the production house "CircleBox Entertainment". Debutant director Johnson K who was known for his works in Nalaiya Iyakkunar has cast Santhanam in the lead role. The filming began during October 2018 with extensively set in North Chennai.

Soundtrack

The music is composed by Santhosh Narayanan and the lyrics were written by Rokesh, GKB and Sean Roldan. The audio rights were sold to Think Music. The songs were released on 24 May 2019, at Suryan FM Radio Station in Chennai with the film's cast and crew. The track "Maalai Nera Mallipoo" is reused from the song "Melam Moge" from the Telugu film Billa Ranga (2013). Both songs composed by Santhosh Narayanan and sung by Chinna.

Critical reception 

A1 received positive reviews from the audience.
Anupama Subramaniam of Deccan Chronicle wrote "Santhanam delivers a stress-buster. If you'd want a movie that is akin to a stress buster, then A1 should be your choice after a heavy workday." Sridhar Pillai in Firstpost says "Santhanam's film is an engaging slapstick comedy not concerned with drama or plot." Thinkal Menon in The Times of India wrote "The plot as such offers nothing new, but A1 provides ample entertainment, thanks to the chemistry between Santhanam, MS Bhaskar, Thangadurai, Manohar and Saikumar."Behindwoods rated 2.5 out of 5 stars stating "Santhanam & Co's comedy one-liners throughout make 'A1' an engaging watch".The Hindu stated "At 109 minutes, this chaotic film is a careful manifestation of problematic ideas, masquerading in the name of harmless comedy".IndiaGlitz rated 2.8 out of 5 stars stating "Go for it without any expectations and enjoy an energetic Santhanam and gang's time pass entertainer".Film Companion stated "Does the story make sense? Not for a second. In fact the whole second half plays out like one long Lollu Sabha sketch. Do the characters have arcs? Not even remotely".The New Indian Express rated 2.5 out of 5 stars stating "A1's teasers proclaimed that humour is the only thing that you should look for from it".Sify rated 3 out of 5 stars stating "Popcorn entertainer".The Indian Express rated 1.5 out of 5 stars stating "A1 has plenty of Lollu Sabha jokes and Santhanam delivers them in his style—but those are the same old things we saw in Inimey Ippadithaan, Sakka Podu Podu Raja and Dhilluku Dhuddu 2".The News Minute rated 2 out of 5 stars stating "'A1' offers some laughs and exposes people's hypocrisy; the lack of layers is easily explained – this is a Santhanam film and not lasagna".

References

External links
 

2019 films
2010s Tamil-language films
Indian romantic comedy films
Films shot in Chennai
2019 romantic comedy films
2019 directorial debut films